Eugenio Testa (6 October 1892 – 11 October 1957) was an Italian actor and film director. He directed and starred in The Monster of Frankenstein (1920), one of the earliest Italian horror films. He was the son of the  stage actor Dante Testa.

Selected filmography

Director
 Il mostro di Frankenstein (1920)

Actor
 Il mostro di Frankenstein (1920)
 The Drummer of Bruch (1948)
 Apartado de correos 1001 (1950)
 The Vila Family (1950)
 My Beloved Juan (1950)
 Doubt (1951)
 Closed Exit (1955)
 Kubala (1955)

References

Sources
 Bayman, Louis. Directory of World Cinema: Italy. Intellect Books, 2011.

External links 
 

1892 births
1957 deaths
Actors from Turin
Italian male film actors
Italian male silent film actors
Italian film directors
20th-century Italian male actors
Film people from Turin